Happenings is an album by the jazz vibraphonist Bobby Hutcherson, released in 1967 on the Blue Note label. The album contains six compositions by Hutcherson, and one by Herbie Hancock, "Maiden Voyage".

Track listing
All compositions by Bobby Hutcherson, except as indicated.
 "Aquarian Moon" - 7:45
 "Bouquet" - 8:10
 "Rojo" - 6:03
 "Maiden Voyage" (Hancock) - 5:49
 "Head Start" - 5:16
 "When You Are Near" - 3:51
 "The Omen" - 6:59

Personnel
Bobby Hutcherson - vibraphone (tracks 1-6), marimba, drums (track 7 only)
Herbie Hancock - piano, box full of rocks (track 7 only)
Bob Cranshaw - bass
Joe Chambers - drums, marimba (track 7 only), triangle (tracks 2, 7), timpani (track 7 only)

References 

1967 albums
Blue Note Records albums
Bobby Hutcherson albums
Post-bop albums
Albums produced by Alfred Lion
Albums recorded at Van Gelder Studio